Tunes of War is the seventh studio album by German heavy metal band Grave Digger. It is a concept about the Scottish struggles for independence from England, from the medieval conflicts between its clans in the 11th century through to the Jacobite rebellion of the 18th.

It is the first album in Grave Digger's trilogy of medievally inspired concept albums which was continued by Knights of the Cross (1998) and concluding with Excalibur (1999).

Track listing
All songs composed & arranged by Grave Digger.

Credits
 Chris Boltendahl - vocals
 Uwe Lulis - guitars
 Tomi Göttlich - bass
 Stefan Arnold - drums

Additional Musicians
 Hansi Kürsch - backing vocals
 Scott Cochrane - bagpipes
 Hans Peter Katzenburg - keyboards

Production
 Chris Boltendahl - producer
 Uwe Lulis - producer
 Suno Fabitch - mixing, engineering
 John Cremer - mastering
 Andreas Schöwe - photography
 Andreas Marschall - cover art
 Ines Phillip - photography

References

Grave Digger (band) albums
1996 albums
GUN Records albums
Concept albums